Franciszek Ksawery Zglenicki (1767 – January 27, 1841) was a Polish Catholic bishop who served as auxiliary bishop of the Diocese of Kraków, and archdeacon of the cathedral chapter in Kraków.

He joined the General Confederation of the Kingdom of Poland in 1812. On December 12, 1824, he was consecrated a bishop by Jan Paweł Woronicz. He then became the apostolic administrator of the Diocese of Kraków, in Woronicz's absence.

He became an auxiliary bishop to Karol Skórkowski, the Bishop of Kraków, and on January 18, 1836, began managing the diocese after the bishop left.

On August 14, 1836, he was consecrated in the church in Proszowice. He served as a priest in the Church of St. Sczcepan in Kraków.

He recognized the relics of Saint Bronislava, and presided over he rbeatification ceremonies, which took place on September 3, 1840.

References

External links 

1767 births
1841 deaths